The 1977 Tampa Bay Rowdies indoor season was the third indoor season of the club's existence.

Overview
Despite much lobbying from Rowdies owner, George W. Strawbridge, Jr., the North American Soccer League voted not to sanction an indoor season or tournament in 1977. As such, Tampa Bay played only two indoor matches that year. The first one versus the Fort Lauderdale Strikers was played on February 27. This marked the first meeting of what would soon become one of the most enduring rivalries in North American soccer, the Florida Derby. The Rowdies' other match was an international friendly against Zenit Leningrad on March 9. At the time Zenit was the reigning champion of the Soviet indoor league. Likewise, the Rowdies were the defending NASL indoor champs. Both matches were played at the Bayfront Center in St. Petersburg, Florida.

Originally Tampa Bay had planned on playing FC Dynamo Moscow, but the match was canceled because of government delays in the Soviet Union. The Rowdies were also the first NASL side to ever be invited to the Wembley Indoor Invitational in mid June. The ten-team tournament featured five English clubs, plus other top squads from Europe. Although they originally planned to attend the London event, ultimately the tournament was canceled and the Rowdies scheduled an outdoor international friendly in Tampa versus A.S. Roma instead.

Longterm cultural significance
Not only was this brief indoor season the flash-point for one of the longest running professional soccer derbies in North America as previously mentioned, but it was significant for another reason. When Ed Tepper approached Earl Foreman about starting a fully professional indoor-only soccer league, he used a videotape of the 1977 Rowdies–Zenit Leningrad match to show not only the game's potential, but also the crowd's enthusiastic responses to the end-to-end action. By October 1977 the pair announced the formation of the Major Indoor Soccer League.
That league would grow to become the sport's standard bearer for many years, even gaining a regular slot in the ESPN programming line up, before finally folding in 1992. Today, though most popular in North America, indoor soccer is played throughout the world, with its own FIFA-like governing body. The World Minifootball Federation, based in the Czech Republic, is the international federation dedicated to promoting the sport.

Club

Roster

Management and technical staff
 George Strawbridge, Jr., owner
 Beau Rogers, general manager
 Eddie Firmani, head coach
 Chas Serednesky, business manager
 Francisco Marcos, director of public relations
 Alfredo Beronda, equipment manager

Competitions

Results summaries

Match reports

Statistics 

G = Goals (worth 2 points), A = Assists (worth 1 point), Pts = Points

Player movement

See also 

 1977 team indoor stats

References 

1977 indoor
Tampa Bay Rowdies (1975–1993) seasons
Tampa Bay Rowdies
Tampa Bay Rowdies
Tampa Bay Rowdies
Tampa Bay Rowdies
Sports in St. Petersburg, Florida